Kangazha is a panchayath and village in the Changanacherry Taluk of the Kottayam District of Kerala State in India. It is located 21 kilometers east of Kottayam and 10 kilometers north of Karukachal. It lies midway between the backwaters of Western Kerala and the misty mountains of the Western Ghats.

Adjacent areas
 West - Nedumkunnam
 North - Pampady
 East - vellavoor and Cheruvally
 South - Ezhumattoor and vaipur

The nearest railway stations are Kottayam (21 km) and Changanacherry (22 km), and the nearest airport is Cochin Airport (Nedumbasserry) about 100 km away. Kangazha is on the Changanassery - Vazhoor state highway which joins Kottayam - Kumaly NH at Pulickalkavala on the north side and on the Karukachal Manimala road on the east side.

Etymology
Kanva, the father of Shakuntala had visited Kangazha and he stoned the Sivalinga in Kangazha. And thus the term Kanvaya which was referred to point this incident become the name of this village and later Kanvaya had reestablished as Kangazha.

Kangazha Mahadeva Temple (Temple of Lord Shiva)
Pathanadu Kavu Bhagawati Temple
Elamkavu Sri Bhadrakali Temple
Uma-Maheswar Temple, Edayarikapuzha

Places of worship
 St. Thomas Orthodox Church  (Kangazha pally)
 Kangazha Mahadeva (Lord Shiva) Temple
 
 Pathanadu Kavu Bhagawati Temple
 Bethel gospel Assembly church Anchani
 Elamkavu Sri Bhadrakali Temple
 
 Edayarikkapuzha Uma-Maheswara Temple
 The Pentecostal Mission (TPM) Church, Mundathanam
 Town Masjid Pathanadu, (Managed by kangazha puthoorpally juma-ath)
Kangazha St Lazarus Orthodox Old Chapel.
 St Antony's Catholic Church, Mundathanam
 St Johns Orthodox Church, Mundathanam
 St.Peter's C.S.I Church, Kangazha - The first Christian church in Kangazha (Estd.1864)
 Puthoorppally Juma-Masjid, Kangazha
 Salvation Army Church, Edayappara
 St George  chapel, cheeramattom
 St.Andrews C.S.I Church Mundathanm

Economy 

The economy of Kangazha is primarily from agriculture. Kangazha is one of the rubber producing villages in Kerala because the hilly terrain, high humidity and good rain make it suitable for rubber cultivation. Other major crops are coconut, tapioca and pepper. NRIs are also another major source of income.

References

Villages in Kottayam district